Discourse & Society is a bimonthly peer-reviewed academic journal that covers the field of discourse analysis. It was established in 1990 by Teun A. van Dijk (Pompeu Fabra University), who has been the editor-in-chief ever since.

Abstracting and indexing 
The journal is abstracted and indexed in Scopus and the Social Sciences Citation Index. According to the Journal Citation Reports, its 2019 one-year impact factor is 1.39, and its five-year impact factor is 1.987, ranking it 71st out of 150 in the category "Sociology", 69th out of 138 in the category "Psychology, Multidisciplinary", and 55th out of 92 in the category "Communication".

External links
 

Discourse analysis
Sociology journals
Publications established in 1990
SAGE Publishing academic journals
Bimonthly journals
English-language journals